Guillaume Bertrand (died 19 May 1356) was a French prelate of the 14th century.

Biography
Coming from the Bertrand family, he was the son of Robert VII Bertrand de Bricquebec, Baron de Bricquebec, and Ide de Clermont-Nesle, and the brother of Marshal Robert VIII Bertrand de Bricquebec.

Guillaume Bertrand was canon at Beaune and bishop of Noyon from 1331 to 1338, then bishop of Bayeux (1338-1347) and bishop of Beauvais (1347-1356).

In 1346 he defended the Chateau de Caen, where the king established him commander when the king of England besieged it.

References

Year of birth unknown
Place of birth unknown
1356 deaths
Place of death unknown
Bishops of Noyon
Bishops of Bayeux
Bishops of Beauvais